Julián Angulo Góngora (born 13 May 1953) is a Mexican lawyer and politician affiliated with the National Action Party. He served as Deputy of the LIX Legislature of the Mexican Congress representing the State of Mexico. He also served in the Congress of the State of Mexico and as municipal president of Cuautitlán.

References

1953 births
Living people
Politicians from the State of Mexico
20th-century Mexican lawyers
National Action Party (Mexico) politicians
National Autonomous University of Mexico alumni
Universidad Iberoamericana alumni
Municipal presidents in the State of Mexico
20th-century Mexican politicians
21st-century Mexican politicians
Members of the Congress of the State of Mexico
Members of the Chamber of Deputies (Mexico) for the State of Mexico